Jessie de Vries (born 26 January 1984) is a former professional tennis player from Belgium. On 11 July 2005, she reached her highest WTA singles ranking of 827.

Her only WTA Tour main-draw appearance came at the Gaz de France Stars where she partnered Debbrich Feys in the doubles event. They lost in the First Round to Croatian Jelena Kostanić Tošić and Luxembourgish Claudine Schaul.

References

External links
 
 

1984 births
Living people
Belgian female tennis players
21st-century Belgian women